Anokopsis is a genus of jumping spiders (family Salticidae). Its single described species, Anokopsis avitoides, is found in Brazil.

References

Salticidae
Monotypic Salticidae genera
Spiders of Brazil